The Yata River is a river of Bolivia.  Parts of the river have been observed to contain flesh eating piranhas.

See also
List of rivers of Bolivia

References
Rand McNally, The New International Atlas, 1993.

Rivers of Beni Department
Ramsar sites in Bolivia